Estrone/progesterone (E1/P4), sold under the brand name Synergon, is a combination medication formulation of estrone, an estrogen, and progesterone, a progestogen, which is used as an injectable preparation to induce withdrawal bleeding in women with non-pregnancy-related amenorrhea (absence of menstruation).
 It has also sometimes been used off-label as an abortifacient. The medication comes in a three-ampoule pack, contains 1 mg estrone and 10 mg progesterone per ampoule, and is administered by intramuscular injection. The usual dose of the medication is three injections each two days apart, with the treatment duration not exceeding one week. E1/P4 is or has been available in France, Monaco, and Turkey, as well as in some French-speaking African countries such as Benin and Cameroon. The medication has been marketed since at least 1952.

See also
 Estradiol/progesterone
 Estradiol benzoate/progesterone
 Estradiol hemisuccinate/progesterone
 List of combined sex-hormonal preparations

References

Abortifacients
Combined estrogen–progestogen formulations
Combined injectable contraceptives